Asadollah Mobasheri or Assadollah Mobashery (‎; 1909–1990) was an Iranian judge, politician, journalist, poet, and translator of Goethe, Henry Corbin, and Karl Jaspers from French into Persian.

He was for a short period of time Minister of Justice at the first and only democratic cabinet after the Islamic Revolution in Iran (1979). He was arrested and imprisoned at the time of Shah and the Islamic Republic both because of his activities for the human rights.

References

External links 
 

1909 births
1990 deaths
20th-century poets
National Front (Iran) politicians
Members of the Iranian Committee for the Defense of Freedom and Human Rights
Members of the Association for Defense of Freedom and the Sovereignty of the Iranian Nation
Translators of Johann Wolfgang von Goethe